James David Barber (August 16, 1921 – December 23, 2001) was a former Democratic member of the Pennsylvania House of Representatives.

References

Democratic Party members of the Pennsylvania House of Representatives
1921 births
2001 deaths
20th-century American politicians